is a Japanese voice actor. Some of his noteworthy roles include Hifumi Izanami in Hypnosis Mic, Lenka Utsugi in God Eater, Shun Mizuki in Time Travel Girl, and Mitsuki in Boruto: Naruto Next Generations.

Biography
Kijima was born in Sapporo on March 29. In elementary school, Kijima had a passion for singing and acting in front of his peers. He was also a fan of anime and western films, notably the Gundam series. After graduating, Kijima worked in a factory in Tochigi Prefecture for a year to save up money before moving to Tokyo. Later at a drinking party, he met with a former colleague who recommended him to Mausu Promotion. He later joined one of their training centers. After some help from Akio Ōtsuka, he began working as a professional voice actor in 2010. In 2019, Kijima, along with the rest of the cast for Hypnosis Mic: Division Rap Battle, won the singing award at the 13th Seiyu Awards.

Filmography

TV series
2012
 Beyblade: Shogun Steel as Torimaki B

2013
 Beast Saga as Argyllo

2015
 God Eater as Lenka Utsugi

2016
 Days as Taro Kisaragi
 Cheer Boys!! as Takuya Nabeshima
 Time Travel Girl as Jun Mizuki

2017
 Boruto: Naruto Next Generations as Mitsuki

2018
 That Time I Got Reincarnated as a Slime as Gido

2020
 Darwin's Game as Keiichi
 Hypnosis Mic: Division Rap Battle: Rhyme Anima as Hifumi Izanami

2022
 The Genius Prince's Guide to Raising a Nation Out of Debt as Deuterio
 Shenmue as Guizhang Chen

2023
 The Legend of Heroes: Trails of Cold Steel – Northern War as Tack

Original net animation (ONA)
2023
 Bastard!! -Heavy Metal, Dark Fantasy- Season 2 as Schen Kerr

Films
2015
 Boruto: Naruto the Movie as Mitsuki
 The Anthem of the Heart as Ryo Shimizu

2021
 Pompo: The Cinéphile as Alan Gardner

Video games
2012
 Fire Emblem Awakening as Azur

2014
Left 4 Dead: Survivors as Yuusuke Kudou

2015
 Fire Emblem Fates as Lazward

2016
 Shin Megami Tensei IV: Apocalypse as Manabu
 I Am Setsuna as End

2017
 Fire Emblem Heroes as Lazward
 Nioh as Shinmen Takezo
 Shin Megami Tensei: Strange Journey Redux as Tyler

2018
 Naruto to Boruto: Shinobi Striker as Mitsuki

Dubbing
2019
 I Lost My Body as Naoufel

References

External links
 Official agency profile 
 

Japanese male video game actors
Japanese male voice actors
Living people
Male voice actors from Sapporo
Mausu Promotion voice actors
Seiyu Award winners
21st-century Japanese male actors
Year of birth missing (living people)